Acrothyra gregaria is a species of gregarious brachiopod known from the Middle Cambrian Burgess Shale. 253 specimens of Acrothyra are known from the Greater Phyllopod bed, where they comprise 0.5% of the community.

References

External links 
 "Acrothyra gregaria". Burgess Shale Fossil Gallery. Virtual Museum of Canada. 2011. (Burgess Shale species 17)

Notes
 BABCOCK, L. E., R. A. ROBISON, M. N. REES, S. PENG, AND M. R. SALTZMAN. 2007. The global boundary stratotype section and point (GSSP) of the Drumian Stage (Cambrian) in the Drum Mountains, Utah, USA. :, 30(002):85-95.
 MATTHEW, G. F. 1901. Acrothyra. A new genus of Etcheminian brachiopods. Nat. Hist. Soc. New Brunswick, Bull, 4:303-304.
 ROWELL, A. H. 1966. Revision of some Cambrian and Ordovician inarticulate brachiopods.
 YOCHELSON, E. L. 1961. The operculum and mode of life of Hyolithes. Journal of Paleontology:152-161.

Burgess Shale fossils
Prehistoric brachiopod genera
Fossil taxa described in 1901
Paleozoic life of New Brunswick
Burgess Shale animals

Cambrian genus extinctions